The following is a list of types of seafood. Seafood is any form of sea life regarded as food by humans. It prominently includes shellfish, and roe. Shellfish include various species of molluscs, crustaceans, and echinoderms. In most parts of the world, fish are generally not considered seafood even if they are from the sea. In the US, the term "seafood" is extended to fresh water organisms eaten by humans, so any edible aquatic life may be broadly referred to as seafood in the US. Historically, sea mammals such as whales and dolphins have been consumed as food, though that happens to a lesser extent in modern times. Edible sea plants, such as some seaweeds and microalgae, are widely eaten as seafood around the world, especially in Asia (see the category of edible seaweeds).

Fish 

 Anchovies  
 Anglerfish
 Barracuda
 Basa
 Bass (see also striped bass)
 Black cod
 Bluefish
 Bombay duck 
 Bonito
 Bream
 Brill 
 Burbot
 Catfish 
 Cod (see also Pacific cod and Atlantic cod)
 Dogfish
 Dorade
 Eel
 Flounder
 Grouper
 Haddock
 Hake
 Halibut
 Herring
 Ilish
 John Dory
 Lamprey  
 Lingcod (see also Common ling)
 Mackerel (see also Horse mackerel)
 Mahi Mahi
 Monkfish
 Mullet
 Orange roughy
 Pacific rudderfish (Japanese butterfish)
 Pacific saury
 Parrotfish
 Patagonian toothfish (also called Chilean sea bass)
 Perch
 Pike
 Pilchard
 Pollock
 Pomfret
 Pompano 
 Pufferfish (see also Fugu)
 Sablefish
 Sanddab, particularly Pacific sanddab
 Sardine
 Sea bass 
 Sea bream
 Shad (see also alewife and American shad)
 Shark
 Skate
 Smelt
 Snakehead
 Snapper (see also rockfish, rock cod and Pacific snapper)
 Sole
 Sprat
 Stromateidae (butterfish)
 Sturgeon
 Surimi
 Swordfish
 Tilapia
 Tilefish
 Trout (see also rainbow trout)
 Tuna (see also albacore tuna, yellowfin tuna, bigeye tuna, bluefin tuna and dogtooth tuna)
 Turbot
 Wahoo
 Whitefish (see also stockfish)
 Whiting
 Witch (righteye flounder) 
 Yellowtail (also called Japanese amberjack)

Roe 
 Caviar (sturgeon roe)
 Ikura (salmon roe)
 Kazunoko (herring roe)
 Lumpfish roe
 Masago (capelin roe)
 Shad roe
 Tobiko (flying-fish roe)

Shellfish

Crustaceans 

 Barnacles (Austromegabalanus psittacus)
 Crabs
 Craw/Cray Fish
 Lobsters
 Shrimps/Prawns

Mollusca 

 Abalone
 Cockle
 Clam
 Loco
 Mussel
 Oyster
 Periwinkle
 Scallop (see also bay scallop and sea scallop)
 Conch (Snails)

Cephalopods  
 Cuttlefish
 Octopus 
 Nautilus 
 Squid

Echinoderms
These are common in some Asian cuisines
 Sea cucumber
 Uni (sea urchin "roe")

Medusozoa

Some species of jellyfish are edible and used as a source of food.

Tunicates (sea squirts) 
Microcosmus sabatieri, also known as sea fig or violet, is eaten in parts of Europe.

Pyura chilensis, known as piure, eaten in Peru and Chile

See also

Notes

External links
 Different Classifications of Fresh Fish and Seafood

Seafood